Eulepidotis colleti is a moth of the family Erebidae first described by Jérôme Barbut and Bernard Lalanne-Cassou in 2011. It is found in the Neotropics, including French Guiana.

References

Moths described in 2011
colleti